Álvaro de la Quadra (? – 1564) was a Spanish churchman and diplomat. He was Prelate and Ambassador to England during Elizabeth I of England reign. He was bishop of Aquila and Venosa and attended the Council of Trent.

He was a descendant of Iñigo López de la Cuadra, who met Ferdinand the Catholic in 1476 on his visit to Vizcaya and captained his personal bodyguard, saving his life in an assassination attempt. His relatives also included Pedro de la Quadra (secretary to Isabella of Portugal) and Juan López de la Quadra (who taught Charles V's children Isabel and John).

According to Enrique García Hernán, on 9 January 1563, the Irish Chief Shane O’Neill, in rebellion against Elizabeth I, requested Spanish military assistance through Quadra, then  Spanish Ambassador in London. Although O'Neill received a negative answer, Elizabeth I asked Madrid to recall Quadra. This leads to believe that Quadra, who died of the plague in England before he could return home, provided some support to O’Neill (probably money) or had done so in the past.

De la Quadra was depicted by James Frain in the 1998 film Elizabeth.

External links and additional sources
 (for Chronology of Bishops)
 (for Chronology of Bishops)

Spanish Roman Catholic bishops
1564 deaths
Spanish diplomats
Year of birth unknown
Bishops of L'Aquila